Yō, Yo, You or Yoh is a unisex (usually masculine) Japanese given name.

Possible writings
Yō can be written using different kanji characters. Some examples: 

洋, "ocean"
羊, "sheep"
瑶, "precious stone"
陽, "sunshine"
容, "contain"
曜, "weekday"
葉, "leaf"
要, "essential"
蓉, "lotus"
庸, "common"
楊, "willow"
燿, "shine"
耀, "shine"

The name can also be written in hiragana よう or katakana ヨウ.

Notable people with the name
, Japanese artist specializing in ceramics
, Japanese singer
, Japanese voice actress
, Japanese actor and voice actor
, Japanese roboticist
, Japanese actor
, Japanese voice actress
, Japanese screenwriter
, Japanese actress
, Japanese voice actor
, Japanese key animator, storyboard artist, and anime director

Fictional characters
, a character in the manga series Shaman King
, a character in the manga series My Hero Academia
, a character in the manga series Deadman Wonderland

See also
Yo
Crochet where "yoh", yarn over hook, is a common term.

Japanese masculine given names
Japanese unisex given names